Harpalus kozlovi is a species of ground beetle in the subfamily Harpalinae. It was described by Kataev in 1993.

References

kozlovi
Beetles described in 1993